Cornisepta monsfuji is a species of sea snail, a marine gastropod mollusk in the family Fissurellidae, the keyhole limpets.

Description

The shell can grow to be 1.8 mm in length.

Distribution
This marine species occurs off Japan.

References

External links
 

Fissurellidae
Gastropods described in 2009